The Institute of Interim Management (IIM) is a UK based professional body for those working in Interim Management in the United Kingdom and internationally.

History 
The Institute of Interim Management was formed and launched in April 2001, with the encouragement and support of the Interim Management Association (IMA) and the Chartered Management Institute (CMI).

Until August 2002, the IIM operated as a Special Interest Group through the CMI infrastructure. Given the IIM’s growing need for greater emphasis on its own specialist area of management, and to facilitate a higher profile for Interim Management within industry and commerce, in August 2002, by mutual agreement with the CMI, the IIM pursued an independent status.

Activities 

Activities for IIM Members and wider members of the Interim Management community are organised and run by its volunteer Board of Interim Managers and supporting community individuals. The IIM organised 75+ events from its formation to the end of the decade. Examples of such activities run by the IIM include the following:

2001 - "Understanding IR35", "Corporate Structures for Interims"
2002 - "The Legal Responsibilities of an Interim Director", "Interim Management & Winning Teams; Networking your way to Profitable Customers"
2003 - "The Changing Turnaround Landscape - What Interim Managers Need to Know", "The Changing Turnaround Landscape (Corporate Value)"
2004 - "Let me through…I’m an Expert!", "Rescue, Recovery, Renewal - Building Corporate Value"
2005 - "When the Going Gets Rough - Board Performance & the Role of the Non-Executive Director", "Succeed as an Interim"
2006 - "Private to Public: Making the Transition", "Fee Negotiation for Interim Managers"
2007 - "Turnaround and Special Situations - new opportunities in the SME sector", "UK Economic Forecast"
2008 - "The Money Laundering Regulations" (multiple events nationwide).
2009 - "IIM Case Study Competition and Finals Night". "IIM online community launched on LinkedIn".
2010 - "Launched Interim Management 'Local Nodes' events", "Campaigning to support Interim Management" 
2011 - "Launched Interim Management 'Media Watch' and celebrated 10th Anniversary"
2012 - "Campaigned against changes to engagement and tax treatment of interim managers"'

Membership 

The following membership categories exist for Managers and Directors:.

 Companion (CIIM) - This category is awarded by the Board of the Institute for significant and sustained contribution to the Institute of Interim Management.
Member (MIIM) - Requires a recognised management or professional qualification AND Is an established Interim manager, who can demonstrate to the satisfaction of the IIM a successful track record of Interim assignments AND Has at least three years' experience in board level/senior management positions OR May be without such a qualification but has at least six years' experience in board level/senior management positions.
 Associate (AIIM) - Requires a recognised management or professional qualification AND Can demonstrate a conscious career choice to be a professional Interim manager AND Has at least three years' experience in board level/senior management positions OR May be without such a qualification but has at least six years' experience in board level/senior management positions.
 Affiliate  - For employees of Corporate IIM Affiliates, requires no specific experience or qualifications for the individual.

References

External links
Institute of Interim Management
(LinkedIn group)

Management organizations
Interim Management